Povey is a surname of medieval English origin.

Notable people with this surname include
Arthur Povey (1886–1946), English cricketer
Daniel Povey, British speech recognition researcher
Guy Povey (born 1960), British racing driver
Jeff Povey, British screenwriter and novelist
John Povey (1621–1679), English-born judge in Ireland
Justinian Povey (d. 1652), English administrator
Megan Povey, food physicist
Meic Povey (1950–2017), British playwright and screenwriter
Thomas Povey (1613/14 – c.1705), English landowner, trader and politician
William Povey (born 1943), English professional footballer

References